In the City is the debut studio album by British band the Jam. Released in May 1977 by Polydor Records, the album reached No. 20 on the UK Albums Chart.

The album features the band's debut single and title track "In the City". In addition, the album includes two cover versions, "Slow Down" and the theme to the 1960s television series, Batman, the latter of which had also been previously covered by the Who, the Kinks and Link Wray.

Critical reception

Upon its release, In the City received all-round positive reviews. Phil McNeil from the NME said that Paul Weller's songwriting "captures that entire teen frustration vibe with the melodic grace and dynamic aplomb of early Kinks and Who". Brian Harrigan of Melody Maker was equally impressed, remarking that Weller's songs "are anything but an embarrassment" and that "he has a deft touch that places his material on a much higher plateau". In Record Mirror, Barry Cain opined: "Armed and extremely dangerous The Jam stalk the decrepit grooves... if you don't like them hard luck coz they're gonna be around for a long time... It's been a long time since albums actually reflected pre-20 delusions". Village Voice critic Robert Christgau said that the band "can put a song together; they're both powerful enough to subsume their sources and fresh enough to keep me coming back for more."

Track listing

Personnel
Credits are adapted from the album's liner notes.

The Jam
 Paul Weller – vocals, guitar
 Bruce Foxton – bass, vocals
 Rick Buckler – drums

Technical
 Vic Coppersmith-Heaven – production, engineering
 Chris Parry – production
 Allen Landau – mastering
 Bill Smith – art direction, design
 Martyn Goddard – front cover photography
 Wade Wood Associates – artwork

Charts

References

1977 debut albums
Polydor Records albums
The Jam albums